Fernando Santiván (1886–1973) was a Chilean writer renowned for winning the Chilean National Prize for Literature in 1952. His real name was Fernando Santibañez Puga.

He was the son of a Spaniard father and Chilean mother. At the age of 8 he was sent to the port city of Valparaiso, where he attended several schools. Later, he attended the prestigious "Instituto Nacional" and the School of Arts & Crafts, from which he was expelled for political reasons.
For a short time, he entered the Pedagogic Institute of the Universidad de Chile, studying maths and Spanish at the same time.

Santivan wanted to work to have his own independence, which led him to take jobs unusual for a future writer; shoemaker, tailor, coal seller, boxer, propagandist, etc.

In 1912 he directed the weekly "Pluma y Lápiz" (Pen & Pencil). In 1914, he acted as secretary in organizing the Chilean Writers Society, the Floral Games that has as a winner the poet Gabriela Mistral, with her Sonnets of Death.

He worked at several magazines and newspapers, directed some, and founded others like the successful magazine Artes y Letras.

By 1952, he received the Literature National Prize.

Santivan had a stroke in the city of Valdivia, where he died in 1973.

1886 births
1973 deaths
Chilean male writers
National Prize for Literature (Chile) winners